Bitburg-Land is a former Verbandsgemeinde (municipal association) in the district Bitburg-Prüm, in Rhineland-Palatinate, Germany. It was situated around the town Bitburg, which was the seat of the Verbandsgemeinde, but not a part of it. On 1 July 2014 it merged into the new Verbandsgemeinde Bitburger Land.

Bitburg-Land consisted of the following Ortsgemeinden ("local municipalities"):

References 

Former Verbandsgemeinden in Rhineland-Palatinate